Leader of the Opposition is a constitutionally sanctioned office in Guyana. The Leader of the Opposition is elected among non-governmental members of the National Assembly of Guyana. Usually the person comes from the largest opposition group in the National Assembly. 

The position was first established in 1966 by the Constitution of Guyana. Historically the leader was appointed by Governor-General of Guyana.

Leaders of the Opposition

See also
Politics of Guyana
President of Guyana
Prime Minister of Guyana

References

Politics of Guyana
Members of the National Assembly (Guyana)
Guyana